Tshering Wangyel ( - 7 December 2015) was a Bhutanese film director. He directed more than 50 films and died of pneumonia while making his last film.

In 1999, he released the first movie in Dzongkha language, Rewaa (Hope), a love story where two college boy fall for the same girl. As one critic put it, "the commercial Bhutanese film industry was born." In 2007, he produced Bakchha, the first Bhutanese horror movie.

References

Year of birth missing
1970s births
2015 deaths
Deaths from pneumonia in Bhutan
Bhutanese film directors